Rebecca Peterson was the defending champion but withdrew before her first round match.

Marcela Zacarías won the title, defeating Katrina Scott in the final, 6–1, 6–2.

Seeds

Draw

Finals

Top half

Bottom half

References

External Links
Main Draw

Rancho Santa Fe Open - Singles